Vadinar is small coastal town located in Devbhumi Dwarka district of the state of Gujarat, India. The offshore oil terminal of the Kandla Port Trust (K. P. T.) (Previously known as Kandla Port Trust, Kandla Port Trust is renamed as Deendayal Port Trust with effect from 25 September 2017, says a notification issued by the ministry of shipping) is located in Vadinar and contributes in a large way to the total earnings of this major port. Vadinar is now notable due to the presence of two refineries which are close by - one promoted by Reliance Industries and the other by Essar Oil Ltd. A salt production unit is located in Vadinar. The famous Narara Island, which is part of Marine National Park, is situated 7 kilometers away from town. You can also find the jellyfish, starfish, crabs, sea turtle and many endangered species over there. Two single-buoy moorings (SBM) of the Kandla Port Trust (now known as Deendayal Port Trust) offshore oil terminal of the Indian Oil Corporation are located at this port along with a similar buoy of the Essar refinery. Indian Oil Corporation crude oil terminal is also located at Vadinar. it is secured by cisf along with KPT Port. The nearest airport is at Jamnagar 47 km away.

Vadinar is divided into three parts: Vadinar Gaon, Vadinar Dhar and KPT Colony. Narara National Marine Park is situated nearly 7 km from KPT Colony. There are schools in Vadinar which is St. Ann's High School Vadinar located in KPT Colony and Shri Navyug Vidhyalaya Vadinar near Singach and a government school. Nearby town to Vadinar are as follows Zakhar, Singach and Bharana.

At Zakhar there is a great temple of Lord Shiva named Jundeshwar Mahadev.

Also at Vadinar is the COT (crude oil terminal) of the Bharat Oman Refineries Limited (BORL) refinery that is situated in BINA in Madhya Pradesh.

Cities and towns in Devbhoomi Dwarka district